Eisteinhovde is a mountain in Lom Municipality in Innlandet county, Norway. The mountain is surrounded by several other notable mountains including Store Lauvhøi to the southwest, Lomseggje to the northwest, Veslekjølen and Skarvhøi to the northeast, Kvitingskjølen to the east, Heranoshøi to the southeast, and Finnshalspiggen and Store Trollhøin to the south.

See also
List of mountains of Norway

References

Lom, Norway
Mountains of Innlandet